A takyeh ( takye; plural:  takâyâ) is a building where Shia Muslims gather to mourn Husayn's death in the month of Muharram. Such buildings are particularly found in Iran, where there are takyehs in almost every city. Tehran alone is said to have had up to 50 takyehs under the Qajar dynasty. Takyehs are usually designed with observable elements of Persian architecture. Takyehs would host ta'ziyeh performances.

Notable takyehs
 Takyeh Dowlat in Tehran
 Takyeh Mir Chakhmaq in Yazd
 Takyeh Moaven-ol-Molk in Kermanshah
 Takyeh Beyglarbeygi in Kermanshah

See also
 Hoseyniyeh

References

 
Architecture in Iran